Sousa refers to
 John Philip Sousa (1854–1932), American composer of marches

Sousa also may  refer to:

People
 Sousa (surname), including other Portuguese variants such as Souza, de Sousa, D'Souza, etc.
 João Sousa, Portuguese tennis player
 Paulo Sousa, Portuguese football manager
 Souza (footballer, born 1975), full name José Ivanaldo de Souza, Brazilian football attacking midfielder
 Souza (footballer, born 1977), full name Sergio Roberto Pereira de Souza, Brazilian football midfielder
 Souza (footballer, born 1979), full name Willamis de Souza Silva, Brazilian former football midfielder and television pundit
 Souza (footballer, born 1982), full name Rodrigo de Souza Cardoso, Brazilian football striker
 Souza (footballer, born 1988), full name Elierce Barbosa de Souza, Brazilian football defensive midfielder
 Sousa (Brazilian footballer), full name Van Basty Sousa e Silva, (born 1994), Brazilian football midfielder

Animals
 Sousa,  genus making up the humpback dolphins

Places

Africa
Soussa or Susa, Libya, town and seaside resort in Jabal al Akhdar District
Susa, Sūsa, Soussa, or Sousse, Tunisian city in Sousse Governorate

Asia
Sousa or Sōsa District, Chiba, Japan, dissolved in 2006

Americas
Sousa, Paraíba, municipality in Brazil
John Philip Sousa Bridge, in the United States

Europe
 Portugal:
Sousa River, in northern Portugal
Aguiar de Sousa, parish in Paredes municipality, Portugal
Paço de Sousa, parish in Penafiel, Portugal
Tâmega e Sousa, administrative division in northern Portugal

Other uses
 Second United States Army
 Sousaphone, marching-band-suitable tuba associated with John Philip Sousa
 Sousa Esporte Clube, Brazilian football (soccer) club
 House of Sousa, A noble house of Portugal between the 9th and 20th centuries

See also
Susa (disambiguation)
Suså (disambiguation)